The following are the national records in athletics in Burkina Faso maintained by Burkina Faso's national athletics federation: Fédération Burkinabé d'Athlétisme (FBA).

Outdoor

Key to tables:

h = hand timing

A = affected by altitude

Men

Women

Indoor

Men

Women

Notes

References
General
World Athletics Statistic Handbook 2019: National Outdoor Records
World Athletics Statistic Handbook 2018: National Indoor Records
Specific

External links

Burkina Faso
Records
Athletics